The 2011 Challenger of Dallas was a professional tennis tournament played on indoor hard courts. It was a Challenger of Dallas competition that forms part of the 2011 ATP Challenger Tour. It took place in Dallas, United States, between 28 February and 6 March 2011.

Ryan Sweeting was the defending champion, but withdrew from the tournament.
Alex Bogomolov Jr. won the tournament after defeating Rainer Schüttler 7–6(7–5), 6–3 in the final.

Seeds

Draw

Finals

Top half

Bottom half

References
 Main Draw
 Qualifying Draw

Challenger of Dallas - Singles
2011 Singles